Ernest Allan Batchelder (January 22, 1875 – August 6, 1957) was an American artist and educator who made Southern California his home in the early 20th century. He created art tiles and was a leader in the American Arts and Crafts Movement.

Early life
Ernest Allan Batchelder was born on January 22, 1875 in Nashua, Hillsborough County, New Hampshire. In 1894, Batchelder began attending classes at Massachusetts Normal Art School (now Massachusetts College of Art and Design), which was founded in 1873 with the intention to support the Massachusetts Drawing Act of 1870 by providing drawing teachers for the public schools as well as training professional artists, designers, and architects.  In 1899 he received his Public School Class diploma. Batchelder came to Pasadena, California, in the early 1900s to teach, and became director of the art department at Throop Polytechnic Institute, the predecessor of the California Institute of Technology.

Career
Batchelder's life took a turn in 1909 when, behind his house overlooking the Arroyo Seco, he built a kiln and entered the business of creating hand-crafted art tiles. The tiles were hugely popular, and by the 1920s, Batchelder's tiles could be found in homes and buildings across the United States. Batchelder's prominence in Southern California's art community included his involvement in the founding of the Pasadena Art Institute and his membership in the Pasadena Society of Artists. Batchelder was also the third Chairman of the Board of Directors for the Pasadena Playhouse, to which he contributed an original tile fireplace and fountain (recently restored).

The style in which Batchelder worked was highly distinctive. First, he used a single-fire process known as engobe in which a primary wash of colored clay slip (usually pale blue) was applied to the surface of the tile before being fired, pooling in the recesses of the design, with excess being wiped off. Then the tile was fired. A typical glazed tile is fired twice–once before glaze, and once after, thereby sealing in the added color. Batchelder's designs often drew on Medieval themes but also included flowers, vines, and California oaks; birds, particularly peacocks; Mayan patterns; Byzantine themes; and geometric shapes.

Batchelder architectural tiles met with great success, and the company moved twice, expanding each time. Its tiles appear on the walls and floors of many New York City apartment house lobbies, and can be found in shops, restaurants, swimming pools and hotels throughout the United States.

One of Batchelder's last and largest projects was the Hershey Hotel in Hershey, Pennsylvania, built by the famous chocolate manufacturer in 1930, in order to give jobs to many local residents who would otherwise have been unemployed during the Depression. Batchelder tiles appeared on the walls, floors and stair risers of a dazzling fountain room, complete with central pool and a mezzanine level. Unfortunately, Batchelder's company, which had employed 150 men at its peak, was forced out of business by the Great Depression in 1932; although Batchelder continued to make pottery in a small shop in Pasadena until the early 1950s. In addition to the Batchelder Tile Company, there were numerous other California tile manufacturers. The abundant local clays, inexpensive fuel, power, and cheap labour were all factors that contributed to an active tile industry, while the rapidly growing population led to a continual demand for new buildings. Moreover, the most popular local architectural styles, such as Spanish, Mediterranean and Colonial Revival, use large amounts of tile.

One of Batchelder's famous earliest commissions became Los Angeles Historical-Cultural Monument No. 137: a Dutch-themed Chocolate Shop. The cocoa-brown walls were crowned with tiles of Dutch maidens, wooden clogs, and windmills. "It's certainly one of the most beautiful and extravagant tile interiors in Los Angeles or anywhere," said Ken Bernstein, manager of the city's Office of Historic Resources. "It's a remarkable example of the use of ceramic tile and a preeminent example of Batchelder's work."

Batchelder House 
The Batchelder House built in Pasadena, California, in the early 1900s, and where he set up his first kiln, is listed on the National Register of Historic Places. He lived nearby to California Impressionism painter Jean Mannheim.  The current resident, the late Dr. Robert Winter, wrote the definitive Batchelder history, Batchelder Tilemaker (1999, Balcony Press). Although the house is not open to the public, some Batchelder tiles, stamped with heraldic animals and figures, may be found on the walkway in front of the dwelling.

Books 
Batchelder wrote two books on tile design: The Principal of Design, (1901); Design in Theory and Practice, (1911).

Awards and honors
Between 2016 and 2017, the Pasadena Museum of History in Pasadena, California hosted Batchelder: Tilemaker, a retrospective of Batchelder's life and career.

See also
California pottery, tile
Artists of the Arroyo Seco (Los Angeles)

References

External links

Throop Polytechnic Institute
The California Institute of Technology
The Pasadena Society of Artists

American artisans
American ceramists
Arts and Crafts movement artists
1870s births
1957 deaths
California people in design
Artists from Pasadena, California
Arts and Crafts architecture in California
Arroyo Seco (Los Angeles County)
California Institute of Technology faculty
19th-century American artists
20th-century American artists